David Venable is an American TV personality and author who has hosted In the Kitchen with David on QVC since 2009. He has also written cookbooks based on the show.

Early life 
Venable was born on November 12, 1964, in Charlotte, North Carolina. He studied journalism at the University of North Carolina at Chapel Hill.

Work on QVC 
Venable was hired by QVC in 1993. He started by promoting the gourmet food products of the company through the station. As time went on, he gradually increased his position on the channel and then started to host his own shows.

Publications 
Venable has released four cookbooks.

References 

Living people
QVC people
American television personalities
UNC Hussman School of Journalism and Media alumni
21st-century American writers
American cookbook writers
1964 births
Writers from Charlotte, North Carolina